Raikko Rain Mateo Gongora (born July 31, 2008), better known as Raikko Mateo, is a Filipino child actor who gained popularity as the lead star of the fantasy-drama Honesto.

Filmography

Television

Film

Awards and nominations

References

Filipino male child actors
ABS-CBN personalities
Filipino television personalities
Star Magic
2008 births
Living people
Star Magic personalities